A Lory is a small to medium-sized arboreal parrot.

Lory may also refer to:

People
 Al De Lory (1930–2012), an American record producer, arranger, conductor and session musician
 Donna De Lory (born 1964), an American singer, dancer and songwriter
 Milo B. Lory (1903–1974), an American sound editor

Other uses
 Lory, a fictional parrot, a minor character in the Alice series by Lewis Carroll
Lory Lake, in Minnesota, U.S.
Lory State Park, near Fort Collins, Colorado, U.S.

See also

Lorry (disambiguation)
Lori (disambiguation)
Loris (disambiguation)
Loris, strepsirrhine primates